Sandrine Voillet is a French art historian and television presenter.

Voillet was raised in Nantes and was educated at the École du Louvre. She has also worked in the film industry.

She made her television debut in 2007 presenting Paris a three-part series made for BBC 2 about the city, and wrote the accompanying book.

Since, she has made guest appearances on other documentaries about Paris such as The Supersizers Eat … the French Revolution (BBC 2, 2009), Monumental Challenge – Eiffel Tower (History Channel, 2011), Pricing the Priceless – Eiffel Tower (US National Geographic, 2011) and Edward Burra, a documentary presented by Andrew Graham Dixon (BBC, 2011).

She has written articles and features for the UK press: Lonely Planet, The Independent, Metropolitan, among others. She is also a scriptwriter, having won the Jury Special Prize at The French Screenwriting Festival in 2001.

References

External links
http://www.sandrinevoillet.com 
 

Living people
Year of birth missing (living people)